The Kition Athletic Center is an indoor arena located in Larnaca, Cyprus. It is the home venue of AEK Larnaca B.C., AEK Larnaca Women's Volleyball Team, AEK Larnaca Futsal, Anorthosis Famagusta Futsal Team and it has a crowd capacity of 3,000 seated spectators.

References

Indoor arenas in Cyprus
Sports venues in Cyprus
Buildings and structures in Larnaca